Love & Emotion is the third album by the dance music artist Stevie B. It was released in 1990 on LMR/RCA Records. It produced the smash hit "Because I Love You (The Postman Song)", which became his only No. 1 hit on the pop charts.

Critical reception
The Rolling Stone Album Guide wrote that "the emphasis shifts from mood to melody, and that makes a world of difference."

Track listing

Japanese Edition

Certifications

Production
Produced by Stevie B., Warren Allen Brooks & Glenn Gutierrez
Engineered by Jimmy Starr
Mixed by Stevie B. & Jimmy Starr
Mastered by Herb Powers
Stevie B.: Drums, percussion, vocals
Dadgel Atabay: Drums, percussion, keyboards
Warren Allen Brooks: Drums, percussion, keyboards
Glenn Gutierrez: Bass, drums, percussion, sound effects, sampling, programming
Claudette De Barros: Vocals

Charts
Album - Billboard (United States)

References

1990 albums
Stevie B albums
RCA Records albums